Tomb of the Mutilated is the third studio album by American death metal band Cannibal Corpse, released on September 22, 1992 by Metal Blade Records. It is the last record with the band's original lineup, as founding guitarist Bob Rusay was fired after the album's release.

The opening track "Hammer Smashed Face" quickly became the band's signature song. The track was featured during the band's cameo appearance in the 1994 comedy film Ace Ventura: Pet Detective, as well as downloadable content for the video game Rock Band video game series. The song "I Cum Blood" is also featured in the video game Grand Theft Auto IV: The Lost and Damned.

Lyrical themes
Reviewers Jack Murray and Connur Joyce have both stated their belief that Tomb of the Mutilated is a high-concept album concerned with extreme necrophilia and sadism. Murray said "It's a very clever idea concerning the rape and murder of a young girl with a large knife, and continuing to rape the corpse until orgasm. This theme is particularly present in the last four tracks on the album", while Joyce announced in Finnish metal magazine Mutilate, "The album has heavy connotations throughout. It's definitely linked; especially in the last three tracks. The explicit nature in which Barnes grunts his way through the increasingly morbid lyrics certainly demonstrates the theme running through the album, that is to say the increasingly deteriorating mental state of the protagonist."

Chris Barnes stated on page 71 of the June 2008 issue of Decibel that "Entrails Ripped from a Virgin's Cunt" was based on two brothers, one of whom was semi-disabled, that were serving a life prison sentence. Barnes stated "They captured some girl, and the semi-retarded brother was talked into putting a coat hanger up her pussy to pull out her intestines." 

Because the liner notes on Butchered at Birth feature quotations from American serial killer Albert Fish, he is often incorrectly credited with being the voice at the beginning of "Addicted to Vaginal Skin". However, the taped confession heard at the beginning of the song most likely belongs to the "Genesee River Killer" Arthur Shawcross.

Reception

Reviewers praised the album. Heavy metal webzine Kicked in the Face stated, "I loved every second of it. This is a must have for any Cannibal Corpse fan. ... It would be hard to pick out the good or the bad tracks on this one because, well, they're all pretty damn good."

Metal Storm announced "the music here is a little more complex and better elaborated, the effort is shown in songs like 'Hammer Smashed Face' with maddening and unforgettable riffs, a crushing bass playing, and incredibly fast drumming, and 'I Cum Blood' showing incredible pulsations ... a high-quality album in general, really one of the greatest albums in Cannibal Corpse history and maybe in Death Metal history too".

In 2005, Tomb of the Mutilated was ranked number 278 in Rock Hard magazine's book of The 500 Greatest Rock & Metal Albums of All Time.

Track listing

Personnel

Cannibal Corpse 
Chris Barnes – vocals
Bob Rusay – lead guitar
Jack Owen – rhythm guitar
Alex Webster – bass
Paul Mazurkiewicz – drums

Production 
Produced, engineered and mixed by Scott Burns

References

1992 albums
Cannibal Corpse albums
Metal Blade Records albums
Albums produced by Scott Burns (record producer)
Albums recorded at Morrisound Recording
Obscenity controversies in music